Sphaerosporella is a genus of fungi in the family Pyronemataceae.

References

Pezizales genera
Pyronemataceae